This is a timeline of the Ming dynasty treasure voyages from 1405 to 1433.

1370s

1380s

1390s

1400s

1410s

1420s

1430s

1460s

References

Bibliography

 

 

Yongle Emperor
History of Kerala
Naval history of China
Timelines of Chinese events
Maritime timelines